Waterford Airport (IATA: WAT, ICAO: EIWF) is located in Killowen,  southeast of Waterford. It serves southeastern Ireland. The airport is operated by Waterford Regional Airport plc.

Its single scheduled route, operated by VLM Airlines—which used Waterford as its only Irish airport and kept a base there—was discontinued from 13 June 2016 as VLM went out of business, leaving the airport without any scheduled traffic.

On 11 June 2019, the Irish government approved a grant of €5 million together with €7 million from local investors and councils. Included in this, is the extension and widening of the existing runway to 2280 metres x 45 metres wide (bigger than the runway at Cork Airport) along with taxiway widening and terminal extension to cater for larger airlines such as Ryanair and Aer Lingus. It is hoped that this extension will boost tourism revenue for the county of Waterford in the long run.

On 4 February 2022, planning permission was granted by An Bord Pleanála for the runway extension and associated works. Construction is set to be completed by the end of 2022.

History

Early years
The airport's development was initiated by Waterford Corporation, with support from the Government of Ireland and the private sector, in 1979–1980. The investment was £1.76 million.

Waterford Airport opened in 1981, with a  runway for single and twin-engine light aircraft and a portable cabin as the terminal building. Avair provided the first domestic passenger service in 1982, as a stop between Cork and Dublin Airport. In 1985, Ryanair launched the company's first international scheduled service from Waterford to London Gatwick.

Development since the 2000s
Waterford Airport celebrated 21 years of scheduled operations in 2006. On 13 March 2007, a €27.5 million upgrade of the airport was announced. There was also an expectation of charter flights to Mediterranean holiday resorts. The expansion would mean that air travellers in the southeast of Ireland would have a "credible alternative" to Dublin and Cork airports, according to officials at Waterford Airport. According to the chief executive of Waterford Airport, Graham Doyle, the extended runway was to be in place by summer 2009 and capable of handling large jet aircraft, including the Airbus A320 and the Boeing 737.

The fully upgraded and remodelled connecting regional road R708 from Waterford city to the airport was completed in early July 2008, reducing the journey time from Waterford city centre to the airport to 10 minutes at off-peak times, and from the outer ring road, R470, to the airport to 5 minutes.

Passenger numbers through Waterford Airport slumped in 2009, owing to the suspension of routes to Bordeaux, Faro, Málaga and Amsterdam, and to service reductions on routes to Birmingham, London Luton and Manchester. Overall passenger numbers from the UK fell by 9%.

2010 to present 
In February 2010, an Economic Impact Assessment of Waterford Airport was published, which highlighted the importance of the airport to the South East Region. Noel Dempsey, the Minister for Transport, announced on 9 March 2010 that owing to difficulties with public finances there would be no funding for the runway extension at the airport, and that security and safety were priorities "in the current financial climate".

In November 2012, Aer Arann announced it would terminate all its routes from Waterford. The airline operating under Aer Lingus Regional suspended its service to London Southend, London Luton and Manchester on 6 January.

On 12 August 2013, it was reported that a 150m extension of the runway would be funded by the Department of Transport up to a limit of €400,000. The airport itself would have to raise the remaining €850,000 for it to take place.

VLM Airlines announced it would terminate its flights to London Luton at short notice by 13 June 2016, leaving Waterford Airport without any scheduled traffic.

In June 2017, after a year without commercial flights a new airline Aer Southeast announced three new year round services to London Luton and Manchester and Birmingham. Although 18 months after the announcement the airline shut down due to a licensing issue.

A €12 million plan was announced in June 2019 to extend the airport's runway by 850 metres and revamp the airport. Minister for Transport Shane Ross was to give the airport €5 million once the extended runway was confirmed and ready for service. Local corporations such as Glanbia, Coolmore Stud and Dawn Meats pledged a total of €5 million with €2 million from local authorities. The extended runway would allow medium-sized commercial passenger jet aircraft such as Boeing 737s and Airbus 320s to use the airport allowing for commercial use. The airport hopes to attract Ryanair back but for now the company has said it's “no plans for the near future” regarding Waterford. Spring 2021 is set for the commencement of commercial flight.

Facilities
Waterford Airport has four check-in desks, an information desk, two boarding gates and two baggage carousels. The airport has two hundred car-parking spaces. Free WiFi is available within the airport terminal. There are two snack bars in the airport: one before security and one in the departures hall. There are also car rental services, a taxi service rank, First Aid, Baby/Parent Room, and Disabled Access/Facilities.

Airlines and destinations

, Waterford Airport has no scheduled commercial passenger flights.

Statistics

Ground transportation

Car
The airport is on the R708 road, which can be accessed from the R710 outer ring road in Waterford. Waterford has a by-pass, and thus the airport can be very easily reached from Dungarvan, Tipperary, Kilkenny, Carlow and Wexford. After reaching the outer ring road, four major primary routes can be accessed from Waterford: towards New Ross, Dublin, Limerick and Cork.

Other transportation connections
The nearest bus and coach station is 10 km away in Waterford, from where Bus Éireann provides services to Dublin, Cork, Limerick, Rosslare Europort, Wexford, Clonmel and Tramore. JJ Kavanagh and Sons offers connections to Dublin Airport, Carlow and Tramore as well. Dublin Coach provides a direct service to Dublin via Kilkenny, and to Cork via Dungarvan. There is also a railway station in Waterford; this offers services to Limerick via Clonmel and Tipperary, and to Dublin Heuston via Kilkenny and Carlow.

Accidents and incidents 

 On 8 July 1999, a Eurocopter AS365 Dauphin of the Irish Air Corps crashed into the sand dunes near Tramore at 00:40 am UTC +1 after returning from a sea-air rescue mission. The helicopter, Rescue 111, was destroyed by fire and all four crew were killed. The Air Accident Investigation Unit report blamed the lack of an air traffic controller in Waterford at the time; inadequate weather reports; faulty approach lighting to the airport runway; the fact that the Air Corps crew undertook the rescue mission even though they had never flown in similar conditions (and had already completed 15 hours flying that day); and an unnecessary delay at the rescue scene, caused by the use of an inadequate lifeboat although a fully equipped one was available.

References

External links

 Official website
 
 

Transport in County Waterford
Airports established in 1981
1981 establishments in Ireland
Airports in the Republic of Ireland